Variety Television Network (VTV) (also referred to as the Variety Channel) was a digital subchannel operated by Newport Television (formerly Clear Channel Communications's broadcast television station division) on various US DTV stations; each station broadcast a similar programming schedule except for some local programming.  The network broadcast classic TV show re-runs, auto showcase programming and various home improvement programs.  The network went off the air in early January 2009.

Program offerings included A Place in the Sun, American Latino TV, The Andy Griffith Show, The Beverly Hillbillies, Bonanza, Dragnet, FreeRide, LatiNation, The Lone Ranger, The Lucy Show, One Step Beyond and Sherlock Holmes.

Stations 
VTV was broadcast on Newport-owned stations in the following communities:
 WXXA-DT (23.2) Albany, New York
 KGPE-DT (47.2) Fresno, California
 WAWS-DT (30.2) Jacksonville, Florida (also carries MyNetworkTV programming)
 KASN-DT (38.2) Little Rock, Arkansas
 WLMT-DT (30.2) Memphis, Tennessee
 WSYR-DT (9.2) Syracuse, New York
 KMYT-DT (41.2) Tulsa, Oklahoma
 KOKH-DT (25.4) Oklahoma City

In many but not all of these markets, VTV programming has been replaced by Untamed Sports TV.

References 

Defunct television networks in the United States
Television channels and stations disestablished in 2009
Television channels and stations established in 2007